Mino Vergnaghi (10 April 1955, Trivero) is an Italian singer and songwriter.
In 1979 he won the Sanremo Music Festival with the song "Amare".

Life and career 
Born in Trivero,  Vergnaghi started his career as lead singer of a number of groups, including Il segno dello zodiaco and Bora Bora. In 1978 he started a solo career under the production of Iva Zanicchi and Maestro Ezio Leoni, debuting with the single "Parigi addio". One year later he was the winner of the 29th edition of the Sanremo Music Festival with "Amare".

In 1980, Vergnaghi temporarily left the music industry and moved to England, returning to Italy in the late 1980s. He then entered the Zucchero Fornaciari's staff, collaborating with him as composer and backing vocalist.

References

Further reading
 Autori Vari (edited by Gino Castaldo), Enciclopedia della canzone italiana, editore Armando Curcio (1990); article Vergnaghi Mino

Italian pop singers
1955 births
Living people
People from Trivero
Sanremo Music Festival winners
Italian songwriters
Male songwriters